Costain West Africa is a building and civil engineering firm founded in Nigeria in 1948. The company was the first building and civil engineering firm to listed on the stock exchange, work orders executed by the firm include construction of the 140 meter high NECOM house, constructed over loose sands with a shallow raft foundation design and University College Teaching Hospital, Ibadan. One of the oldest civil engineering and building companies established in Nigeria, from 1950 to the end of the twentieth century, it executed highway, roads, building and civil works projects both in private and public sectors. Lately, the fortunes of the company has been mixed, with the firm sometimes unable to meet its obligations.

History
Costain West Africa was established in 1948 as a civil engineering and building company with substantial shareholdings held by John Holt Plc. It was founded as a subsidiary of Richard Costain. Involved in projects in all regions of the country, in the mid-1950s, the firm completed civil works at Ijora Power Station and extension of Apapa Wharf, and its building division built Bishopscourt along the Marina, Lagos. In 1957, a partnership with CDC and the government of Northern Nigeria led to the construction of a housing estate in Kaduna, the firm was involved in the construction of Wuya bridge over Kaduna River a Bida and Shell estates in Port Harcourt.

In 1982, the company won a state bid that gave it one of its biggest orders, a project to develop Oyo State water supply system.

Projects
Ahmadu Bello Stadium, Kaduna work order from the regional Ministry of Social Welfare and Cooperatives, Northern Nigeria.
Bata Shoe factory.
Phase II Nigerian Telecommunication System
Central Bank, Enugu
Apapa factory of Flour Mills of Nigeria.

References

Construction and civil engineering companies of Nigeria
1948 establishments in Nigeria
Construction and civil engineering companies established in 1948